Eglinton railway station is a proposed station on the Joondalup Line in Perth, Western Australia. It is part of the Metronet project. Construction of the station Started in 2021, with expected completion .

Eglinton Station will include a weather-protected bus interchange with 8 stands, approximately 400 parking bays which can be expanded to 1000, and 14 motorbike bays. The station will also contain 2 bike shelters and 10 U-rails.

The station will be situated south of Pipidinny Road and east of Marmion Avenue and will be accessed off a purpose-built street, as part of the Eglinton Estates development. The station will also be situated in a cutting with at least 50 percent coverage, similar to Joondalup station, and will be accessed via a station building at ground level. Approximately 4,792 daily boardings are predicted at Eglinton railway station in 2031.

At the 2021–22 State Budget, it was announced that the Yanchep rail extension had been deferred by 12 months, as a result of Western Australia's skills shortage. This was alongside the deferment of 15 other state government infrastructure projects.

Foundation works on the station began in December 2021.

References

External links
 Yanchep Rail Extension website page for Alkimos, Eglinton and Yanchep railway stations

Proposed railway stations in Perth, Western Australia